This list of songs recorded by Magnapop includes 106 different recordings released by the Atlanta alternative rock band Magnapop.

Cover versions of Magnapop songs

External links

Magnapop at Discogs

Magnapop